Miss Universe Spain 2019 was the seventh edition of the Miss Universe Spain pageant, held on September 18, 2019. The winner was Natalie Ortega Tafjord of Barcelona and she represented Spain in Miss Universe 2019. This was the first and only edition under the Jorge Diez Vanila directorship of the Be Miss Organization. The following year they dissociated themselves from the Miss Universe franchise in Spain. The license then goes to the Nuestra Belleza España Organization after this.

Final results

Special Awards

Official Delegates

Notes

Withdrawals
 Cantabria
 Galicia
 Salamanca
 Valencia
 Zaragoza

Did not compete
  Almería
  Araba
  Asturias
  Ávila
  Badajoz
  Burgos
  Cáceres
  Cádiz
  Castellón
  Castilla-La Mancha
  Castile and León
  Ciudad Real
  Córdoba
  Cuenca
  Gerona
  Guadalajara
  Guipúzcoa
  Huelva
  Huesca
  Jaén
  La Coruña
  La Rioja
  León
  Lérida
  Lugo
  Málaga
  Melilla
  Navarra
  Orense
  Pontevedra
  Soria
  Teruel
  Toledo
  Valladolid
  Vizcaya
  Zamora

References

External links

Universe Spain
Miss Spain
September 2019 events in Spain
2019 in Madrid